Langadi  is a Rural Municipal in (Nepal) Parsa District in the Narayani Zone of southern Nepal. At the time of the 2011 Nepal census it had a population of 3,421 people living in 525 individual households. There were 1,739 males and 1,682 females at the time of census. Madan Prasad chauhan(janta Samajbadi party) is Chairman and Manju Devi(Nepali Congress) is sub-Chairman of Dhobini Rural Manucipality.

References

Populated places in Parsa District